The Kwelera Nature Reserve, a park in the greater East London Coast Nature Reserve, is a coastal forest reserve in the Wild Coast region of the Eastern Cape, South Africa. Access to the reserve is through the adjacent Kwelera National Botanical Garden, which the Kwelera Nature Reserve now serves as part of the botanical garden. The reserve stretches from the Kwelera River on the eastern side, to the Gqunube River (Gonubie) at the western end of the reserve.

Etymology 
 is the anglicised Khoi word for 'place of aloes'.

History 
The  reserve was created in 1983 along with the Gulu Nature Reserve and Cape Henderson Nature Reserve for the conservation of the region's fauna and flora. 

In 2014,  were purchased by SANBI for the creation of the Kwelera National Botanical Garden; this land would be added to the reserve and become the first national botanical in the Eastern Cape. It would be jointly managed by SANBI and Eastern Cape Parks.

Kwelera Island Local Nature Reserve 
In 1994, at the mouth and last bend of the Kwelera River  of land opposite the reserve was established as a protected area and called the Kwelera Island Local Nature Reserve.

Geography 
The highest peak, named Magozo, is a 77-metre high dune in the coastal dune forest. The village of Kwelera is surrounded by the reserve.

Biodiversity 
This reserve, flanked on either side by estuaries, consists of coastal dune vegetation that hosts a profusion of wildlife, which include:

Birds 
Emerald-spotted wood dove, fish eagle, heron and Knysna turaco.

Fish 
Bluefish, mullet, rays, Sand sharks and strepies.

Insects 
The rare deceptive diadem butterfly.

Mammals 
Small buck like blue duiker and bushbuck, caracals, porcupine, vervet monkeys, whales and dolphins.

Reptiles 
Puff adder.

Vegetation 
The subtropical and temperate zone vegetation receives on average 800mm of rainfall a year. White milkwood, red milkwood and silver oak are found throughout the reserve. The flame lily, paintbrush lily and orchids are also found under cover of the milkwoods and oaks. Other flowering plants found on the reserve are the sour fig, winter poker, Haemanthus albiflos, num-num and Clematis brachiata. Sea pumpkin are instrumental in stabilising the dunes. Also found along the coast is the wild banana and aloe.

Trails 
The Strandloper Trail traverses across the reserve to Gonubie.

See also 

 List of protected areas of South Africa

References 

Nature reserves in South Africa
Eastern Cape Provincial Parks